Hastrup is a Danish surname. Notable people with the surname include:

Jannik Hastrup (born 1941), Danish writer, film director, producer, illustrator and animator
Vibeke Hastrup (born 1958), Danish actress

See also
Mads Vibe-Hastrup (born 1978), Danish golfer
16589 Hastrup, main-belt asteroid

Danish-language surnames